The Sabuncubeli Tunnel is a road tunnel located on the Mount Sipylus in Aegean Region as part of the Manisa-Izmir highway   in Turkey.

In 2011, the Manisa-Izmir route had a daily traffic rate of 30,000 vehicles. The tunnel is being built to bypass the steep and twisty route at Sabuncubeli Pass, reducing the grade of highway from 7–8% to 1.5%. When completed, it will shorten the travel time between Manisa and Izmir from 45 minutes to 15 minutes, and will contribute to elimination of traffic congestion in the winter time.

The contract for the building of the tunnel was awarded to Koçoğlu and Makimsan Consortium on the build-operate-transfer basis, and was signed on August 18, 2011. It was projected that the -long tunnel was to be finished within three years costing 110 million. The groundbreaking ceremony took place in presence of Minister of Transport, Maritime and Communication Binali Yıldırım on September 9, 2011. The construction works were suspended for seven months right after the groundbreaking in order to undertake a revision in the tunnel project. The estimated cost was revised to 150 million.

A landslide, which occurred in the western tube on the northeast portal during the excavation works in 2013, caused the lengthening of the tunnel to now , and hence a delay in the construction's completion. The tunnel opening is postponed from 2015 to end 2016 but it did not open.

The constructing company had the concession to operate the tunnel for a time span of 11 years 11 months and 11 days after its opening, and to collect the Turkish lira equivalent of US$2.50 as toll but it went bankrupt. The tunnel opened on 11 June 2018. Turkish Prime Minister Binali Yıldırım was the first one who drove in the tunnel.

Criticism
Hasan Sözbilir, a professor at Dokuz Eylül University and member of the Izmir Branch of the Chamber of Engineering Geology, warned at a press conference in December 2012 that the Sabuncubeli Tunnel is situated entirely on one of the fault zones in the region. He added that structural measures have to be taken to prevent any damage in case of an earthquake.

References

Transport in Manisa Province
Transport in İzmir Province
Tunnels completed in 2018
Manisa
Bornova District